Roméo Boni (born 7 February 1990) is a Burkinabé international footballer who plays for AS Police, as a striker.

Career
Born in Bobo-Dioulasso, he has played club football for AS Police.

He made his international debut for Burkina Faso in 2018.

References

1990 births
Living people
Burkinabé footballers
Burkina Faso international footballers
AS Police (Ouagadougou) players
Association football forwards
21st-century Burkinabé people
Burkina Faso A' international footballers
2018 African Nations Championship players